This is a list of Puerto Ricans in the continental United States and Hawaii, including people born in the United States proper of Puerto Rican descent and Puerto Ricans who live in the United States proper. Since those born in Puerto Rico are US citizens, it is easier to migrate to the United States proper from Puerto Rico than from anywhere else in Latin America. Currently, more than 5.5 million Puerto Ricans and their descendants live in the United States proper, significantly more than the population of Puerto Rico itself. The following list contains notable members of the Puerto Rican community.

Television show hosts 

 La La Anthony television personality, video jockey and actress; host of MTV's TRL
 Daisy Martinez actress, model, chef, television personality and author; host of PBS television series Daisy Cooks!
 John Melendez television writer and former radio personality
 Rogelio Mills television personality; Puerto Rican/Black Hispanic American
 Antonio Sánchez radio and television personality, show host and producer
 Fernando Allende  (Mexican/Puerto Rican host)hosts Miss World international live telecast to 153 countries for the fourth time in a row. Also hosted Buscando Estrellas; Spanish speaking equivalent to star search. Also hosted all the promos for the soccer World Cup and starred in the successful show "Hot Hot Hot", produced by Dick Clark.
 Vanna White Co-Host of Wheel of Fortune (American game show)

Business 

 Kimberly Casiano President and Chief Operating Officer of Casiano Communications
 María Elena Holly Puerto Rican widow of rock and roll pioneer Buddy Holly; lives in Texas and New York
 Ralph Mercado promoter of Latin American music, including Latin jazz, Latin rock, merengue and salsa; established a network of businesses
 Lisette Nieves founder of Atrevete Latino Youth, Inc., an organization which focuses on the educational and leadership training of young Latinos
 Samuel A. Ramirez, Sr. first Hispanic to launch a successful investment banking firm
 Angel Ramos founder of Telemundo, the second largest Spanish-language television network in the United States
 Xavier Romeu Executive Director of Puerto Rico Industrial Development Company
 Herb Scannell President of BBC Worldwide America
 Nina Tassler television executive; President of CBS Entertainment since September 2004
 Richard Velazquez first Puerto Rican automotive designer for Porsche; first Puerto Rican Xbox product planner; co-founder and President of NSHMBA Seattle
 Maria Vizcarrondo-De Soto President and CEO of the United Way of Essex and West Hudson

Actors and actresses 

 Kirk Acevedo actor, HBO series Oz, Band of Brothers, Fringe
 Fernando Allende   actor (Mexican/Puerto Rican)
 Daniella Alonso actress
 Trini Alvarado actress, flamenco dancer, and flamenco Singer
 Tyler Alvarez  American actor of Puerto Rican and Cuban descent (Every Witch Way, American Vandal)
 Philip Anthony-Rodriguez actor and singer
 Victor Argo actor
 Yancey Arias American actor of Colombian and Puerto Rican descent
 Rick Aviles stand-up comedian and actor, Ghost
 Jake T. Austin actor, Wizards of Waverly Place
 Charlotte Ayanna actress and former Miss Teen USA
 Adrienne Bailon singer and actress
 Rosa Blasi actress
 Diego Boneta American actor and singer; father is Mexican, mother was born in the US, to a Puerto Rican father and Spanish mother
 Paul Calderón actor
 Nydia Caro actress and singer
 David Castro actor
 Raquel Castro teen actress and singer
 Míriam Colón actress and founder and director of the Puerto Rican Traveling Theater in New York City
 Liza Colón-Zayas actress and playwright
 Kevin Corrigan actor
 Aulii Cravalho actress
 Alexis Cruz actor
 Wilson Cruz actor

 Henry Darrow actor of stage and film
 Raúl Dávila actor, All My Children
 Rosario Dawson actress
 Roxann Dawson actress, Star Trek: Voyager; producer and director
 Idalis DeLeón actress, singer, and television host
 Michael DeLorenzo actor
 Melonie Diaz actress
 Sully Diaz actress and singer, Coralito
 Shabba Doo actor, dancer, choreographer, and director
 Héctor Elizondo actor
 Erik Estrada actor
 Antonio Fargas actor, 1970s blaxploitation films

 José Ferrer actor
 Miguel Ferrer actor, Crossing Jordan; son of José Ferrer
 Franky G film and television actor
 Gloria Garayua film and television actress
 Aimee Garcia father is from San Juan
 Mayte García American dancer, actress, singer, and choreographer
 Marilyn Ghigliotti character actress, Clerks
 Ian Gomez actor, known for his comedic TV work, Felicity, Cougar Town
 Marga Gomez comedian, playwright, and humorist
 Reagan Gomez-Preston American actress of Puerto Rican and African descent
 Rick Gonzalez actor, film Coach Carter, television series Reaper
 La'Myia Good actress
 Meagan Good actress
 Camille Guaty actress
 Luis Guzmán actor
 April Lee Hernández actress
 Kristin Herrera actress, Zoey 101
 Jon Huertas American actor, Castle; of Puerto Rican and African descent
 Mark Indelicato actor and singer, Ugly Betty
 Vincent Irizarry actor
 Shar Jackson American actress; of African, Puerto Rican and Mexican descent
 Cherie Johnson American actress, Punky Brewster, Family Matters; of African American and Puerto Rican descent
 Raúl Juliá (1940–1994) Puerto Rican actor and playwright
 Victoria Justice American actress, singer, and songwriter; mother is Puerto Rican
 Eva LaRue American actress, CSI: Miami; of French, Puerto Rican, Dutch, and Scottish ancestries
 John Leguizamo American actor, born in Colombia to a Puerto Rican parent.
 Adrianne Leon American actress, singer-songwriter, guitarist; of Puerto Rican, Italian and Canadian descent
 Sunshine Logroño actor, radio announcer, television show host, singer, comedy writer, entrepreneur and comedian; American born and of Puerto Rican descent; raised in Puerto Rico
 Priscilla Lopez American singer, dancer, and actress; of Puerto Rican descent
 Gina Lynn Puerto Rican pornographic actress; raised in New Jersey
 Justina Machado actress, Six Feet Under
 Sonia Manzano American actress and writer, Sesame Street
 Eddie Marrero American actor
 Tony Martinez (1920–2002) Puerto Rican actor, singer, and bandleader; The Real McCoys TV series; US resident
 Ricardo Medina, Jr. American actor, Power Rangers Wild Force; of Puerto Rican descent
 Jorge Merced New York-based Puerto Rican actor, theater director, and gay activist
 Lin-Manuel Miranda (born 1980) American actor, composer, lyricist,  singer, rapper, actor, producer, and playwright, known by his roles in Broadway musicals. He is of mostly Puerto Rican descent, but he also is a quarter Mexican.
 Ruby Modine American actress to a Puerto Rican mother.
 Esai Morales American actor, La Bamba
 Rita Moreno Puerto Rican singer, dancer and actress; US resident
 Frankie Muniz American actor, Malcolm in the Middle; father is Puerto Rican, mother is of Italian and Irish descent
 Christian Navarro  American actor of Puerto Rican descent (13 Reasons Why)
 Taylor Negron American writer, actor, and stand-up comedian; of Puerto Rican descent
 Micaela Nevárez Puerto Rican actress; has appeared in independent and European films; family immigrated to the US when she was 10
 Amaury Nolasco Puerto Rican actor, television series Prison Break, film Transformers
 Miguel A. Núñez Jr. American actor of Puerto Rican and Dominican descent
 Tony Oliver  Puerto Rican born American voice actor (Robotech, Fate/stay night, Lupin the Third). 
 Karen Olivo American actress; of Dominican, Puerto Rican, Native American, and Chinese descent
 Ana Ortiz American actress and singer; of Puerto Rican and Irish descent
 John Ortiz American actor and artistic director/co-founder of LAByrinth Theater Company
 Ronnie Ortiz-Magro American television personality and actor; Italian-American father and Puerto Rican mother
 Lana Parrilla American actress; Sicilian mother and Puerto Rican father
 Rosie Perez American actress; Puerto Rican parents
 Miguel Piñero (1946–1988) Puerto Rican playwright, actor, and co-founder of the Nuyorican Poets Café; a leading member of the Nuyorican literary movement; died in New York
 Aubrey Plaza American actress, comedian and producer of Puerto Rican and English-Irish descent.
 Carlos Ponce Puerto Rican actor, singer, composer and television personality; lived in Miami, Florida
 Freddie Prinze (1954–1977) American actor and comedian of Puerto Rican and German descent
 Freddie Prinze Jr. American actor; son of Freddie Prinze
 Anthony Ramos American actor of Puerto Rican descent.
 Luis Antonio Ramos Puerto Rican-born American actor, film and television
 Kamar de los Reyes Puerto Rican born and American raised
 Armando Riesco Puerto Rican film and television actor and voice artist
 Chita Rivera  American actress, dancer, and singer best known for her roles in musical theatre. Her father was Puerto Rican.
 Vanessa del Rio retired American pornographic actress; of Cuban and Puerto Rican descent
 Chita Rivera American actress, dancer, and singer; known for her roles in musical theater; of Puerto Rican and of Scottish and Italian descent
 José Rivera Puerto Rican playwright living in Hollywood, California
 Marquita Rivera (1922–2002) Puerto Rican actress, singer and dancer; dubbed the "Queen of La Conga," "Queen of Latin Rhythm," and "Latin Hurricane"
 Naya Rivera American actress; of Puerto Rican, African American, and German descent
 Adam Rodriguez American actor, CSI: Miami; of Puerto Rican and Cuban descent
 Elizabeth Rodriguez American actress of Puerto Rican parents
 Freddy Rodriguez American actor; of Puerto Rican descent
 Gina Rodriguez  American actress of Puerto Rican parents (Jane the Virgin)
 Jai Rodríguez musician and actor, Queer Eye for the Straight Guy; of Puerto Rican and Italian descent
 Michaela Jaé Rodriguez  American actress and Singer. One of her grandparent was Puerto Rican.
 Michelle Rodríguez American actress, Lost; father is Puerto Rican, mother is Dominican
 Ramón Rodríguez American actor of Puerto Rican descent
 Zoe Saldaña American actress; Dominican father and Puerto Rican mother 
 Olga San Juan (1927–2009) American actress; of Puerto Rican descent
 Kiele Sanchez American actress; of Puerto Rican and French descent
 Marcelino Sánchez (1957–1986) Puerto Rican film and television actor
 Saundra Santiago American actress; 1980s television series Miami Vice; of Cuban and Puerto Rican descent
 Ray Santiago American actor
 Renoly Santiago Puerto Rican-born and raised in Union City, New Jersey
 Ruben Santiago-Hudson actor and playwright
 Jon Seda American actor; Puerto Rican parents
 Josh Segarra (1986-) American actor of Puerto Rican descent (The Electric Company, Sirens, and Arrow)
 Gregory Sierra (1937–2021) American actor of Puerto Rican descent
 Ebonie Smith Puerto Rican-born American former child actress, The Jeffersons; of African American and Dominican descent
 Jimmy Smits American actor; of Puerto Rican and Surinamese descent
 Talisa Soto American actress; Canadian father of Puerto Rican descent, Italian mother
 Jeremy Suarez American actor, film producer and director (The Bernie Mac Show)
 Rachel Ticotin American film and television actress; of Jewish and Puerto Rican descent
 Benicio del Toro Puerto Rican actor resident of Pennsylvania
 Liz Torres actress, singer, and American comedian; of Puerto Rican descent
 Rose Troche (born 1964) film and television director, television producer, and screenwriter; Go Fish; Six Feet Under, The L Word; of Puerto Rican descent
 Alanna Ubach American actress; of Puerto Rican and Mexican descent
 Nadine Velazquez American actress; of Puerto Rican descent
 Desiree Marie Velez American actress
 Eddie Velez (The A-Team)
 Lauren Vélez American actress, Dexter; of Puerto Rican descent
 Loraine Vélez American actress; Puerto Rican parents; sister of Lauren Vélez
 Christina Vidal American actress; of Puerto Rican parents
 Lisa Vidal American actress; of Puerto Rican descent
 Holly Woodlawn Puerto Rican-born transgender actress and former Warhol superstar
 David Zayas American theatrical, film, and television actor, Dexter; Puerto Rican born and American raised

Directors, producer and screenwriters of films, theater and TV 
 Miguel Arteta Puerto Rican film and television director; film The Good Girl; television series Six Feet Under
 Giannina Braschi author of experimental theater including United States of Banana
 Ivonne Belén Puerto Rican documentary film director and producer
 Richard Peña American film festival organizer, New York Film Festival; professor of film studies at Columbia University
 Tony Taccone American theater director; of Italian and a Puerto Rican descent
 Joseph Vasquez (1962–1995) American independent filmmaker
 Fernando Allende singer, actor, painter, film producer, and film director

Singers and musicians

Alphabetized by surname

 6ix9ine American rapper of Mexican and Puerto Rican descent
 Princess Nokia American rapper of Puerto Rican descent
 Agallah, aka "8-Off the Assassin" or "Don Bishop" Puerto Rican and Filipino-American rapper; former member of The Diplomats-affiliated group Purple City and the group Propain Campaign
 Johnny Albino (1919–2011) Puerto Rican bolero singer
 Fernando Allende (Mexican/Puerto Rican) With more than 100 songs recorded in 16 different projects in English and Spanish and having been the songwriter of many of these songs Fernando Allende is an icon named the ambassador to the mariachis for perpetuity in Mexico by its government.
 Tite Curet Alonso (1926–2003) composer of over 2,000 salsa songs
 Melanie Amaro American-born British Virgin Islands singer; won the first season of The X Factor USA in 2011
 Marc Anthony American singer of Puerto Ricans parents
 Chucho Avellanet Puerto Rican singer of ballads and pop music; son of Adolfo Avellanet
 Manolo Badrena Puerto Rican percussionist, known for his work with Weather Report from 1976 to 1977
 Adrienne Bailon American singer and actress; Puerto Rican mother, Ecuadorian father
 Lloyd Banks American rapper, member of G-Unit; of Puerto Rican and African American descent
 Ray Barretto (1929–2006) Puerto Rican jazz musician
 Nessa Barrett – American singer of Puerto Rican descent
 Samuel Beníquez Puerto Rican writer, composer, music producer, businessman, publicist, activist, and philanthropist
 Eddie Benitez Puerto Rican guitarist
 John Benitez, better known as "Jellybean Benitez" American drummer, guitarist, songwriter, DJ, remixer and music producer; of Puerto Rican descent
 Obie Bermúdez Puerto Rican-American R&B and salsa singer and composer
 BIA American rapper
 Big Pun (1971–2000) American rapper; of Puerto Rican descent
 Angela Bofill American R&B vocalist and songwriter; Cuban father, Puerto Rican mother
 Kid Buu American rapper of Puerto Rican and Sicilian descent
 Tego Calderón Puerto Rican rapper and actor
 Michael Camacho half of the short-lived 80s dance-pop duo Sly Fox; born in Los Angeles, of Puerto Rican descent
 Bobby Capó (1922–1989) internationally known singer and songwriter from Puerto Rico; usually combined ballads with classical music
 Irene Cara American singer and actress; of Puerto Rican and Cuban descent
 Kevin Ceballo singer of salsa music of Puerto Rican descent
 Chayanne Puerto Rican singer; resident of Miami
 Chelo Puerto Rican hip-hop and pop singer, based in Miami Beach, Florida
 CJ American rapper
 Angel Clivillés American singer founder and member of The Cover Girls
 Robert Clivillés American singer, founder and member of C + C Music Factory
 Javier Colon American singer and songwriter; of Dominican and Puerto Rican descent
 Willie Colón Nuyorican salsa musician
 Federico A. Cordero Puerto Rican guitarist of classical music
 Corina American singer
 Eric "Bobo" Correa of Cypress Hill, Cultura Londres Proyecto and Sol Invicto
 Elvis Crespo Puerto Rican singer; born in New York City; Puerto Rican parents; raised in Puerto Rico
 Joe Cuba (1931–2009) Nuyorican musician; considered the "father of Latin Boogaloo"
 Daddy Yankee Puerto Rican singer of reggaeton
 Prince Markie Dee American rapper, songwriter, producer, and radio personality; member of the Fat Boys; of Puerto Rican descent
 Carmen Delia Dipiní Puerto Rican singer of boleros
 Diamond American rapper of Puerto Rican and African-American descent from the rap group Crime Mob
 Howie Dorough American musician; oldest member of the Backstreet Boys; Puerto Rican mother
 Huey Dunbar American former singer of Dark Latin Groove; of Jamaican and Puerto Rican descent
 Fat Joe American rapper; parents of Puerto Rican and Cuban descent
 Cheo Feliciano Puerto Rican composer and singer of salsa and bolero music
 José Feliciano Puerto Rican singer, virtuoso guitarist and composer known for many international hits; raised in New York
 Pedro Flores Puerto Rican composer and bandleader
 Héctor Fonseca house music DJ
 Luis Fonsi Puerto Rican singer of pop-ballad and pop-rock; resident of Florida
 Angelo Garcia member of Puerto Rican boy band Menudo from 1988 to 1990
 Mayte Garcia dancer and American singer; of Puerto Rican ancestry
 Sergio George pianist and American record producer, has worked with many famous performers of salsa music; parents are Puerto Rican
 Gisselle American Merengue singer; Puerto Rican parents
 Jenilca Giusti Puerto Rican singer-songwriter and actress; lived in Florida since age 8
 Kenny "Dope" Gonzalez American dance musician
 Hex Hector American dance remixer; of Puerto Rican and Cuban descent
 Joseline Hernandez television personality and rapper from Love & Hip Hop
 Oscar Hernández Puerto Rican musician
 Rafael Hernández Puerto Rican composer, musician and bandleader; considered by many the greatest Puerto Rican composer of popular music
 Lee Holdridge Haitian-born American composer and orchestrator; of Puerto Rican and American descent
 La India Puerto Rican singer
 Nicky Jam reggaeton singer; Dominican mother, Puerto Rican father
 Jim Jones American rapper; of Puerto Rican and Aruban descent
 Alexis Jordan American singer and actress; mother is of African American, American Indian, and European descent, father is Puerto Rican
 Big Daddy Kane – American rapper of Puerto Rican and African American descent
 Kelis American musical artist; father is African-American, mother is of half Puerto Rican descent
 Tori Kelly – singer father is Puerto Rican and Jamaican descent
 Kurious American hip hop artist; of Puerto Rican and Cuban descent
 George Lamond American freestyle music singer, of Puerto Rican descent
 Héctor Lavoe (1946–1993) Puerto Rican singer, resident of New York
 Manny Lehman American house music DJ and producer
 Lil Suzy half Italian, half Puerto Rican American Latin freestyle, pop- and dance-music singer
 Toby Love Puerto Rican American singer-songwriter; Puerto Rican parents
 Lumidee American singer-songwriter and rapper

 Adrianne León American singer-songwriter, chef, personal fitness trainer, model and actress; of Puerto Rican, Italian, and Canadian descent
 Lisa Lisa part of the urban contemporary Cult Jam band
 Jennifer López singer; Puerto Rican parents
 Víctor Manuelle American salsa singer; of Puerto Rican descent

 Bruno Mars American singer-songwriter and record producer; parents  of Puerto Rican and Filipino origin
 Ricky Martin Puerto Rican resident of Los Angeles
 Angie Martínez American radio personality, actress, and rapper
 Paul Masvidal guitarist, singer, founding member of the progressive metal band Cynic; previously led the alternative rock band Æon Spoke
 Maxwell American R&B, funk and neo soul musician; Puerto Rican father<ref>[http://www.mtv.com/news/articles/1622567/20090929/maxwell.jhtml www.mtv.com/news/articles/1622567/20090929/maxwell.jhtml]</ref>
 Scotty McCreery American country singer; father is Puerto Rican of American and Puerto Rican descent
 Lisette Meléndez American freestyle and Latin pop and dance-pop singer
 Syesha Mercado American singer, songwriter, actress and model; of African-American and Puerto Rican descent
 Julia Migenes American mezzo-soprano; of Greek, Irish and Puerto Rican descent
 Lin-Manuel Miranda Puerto Rican-American composer and lyricist and actor
 David Morales house music DJ and American producer
 Flor Morales Ramos better known as Ramito, an important singer and composer of música jíbara
 Emcee N.I.C.E. American rapper, songwriter and producer; lead vocalist and rapper of KansasCali & The Rocturnals; has appeared on 28 records since 2000, including Tupac's Thugz Mansion and soundtrack of the Oscar-winning film Crash; of Puerto Rican descent
 Rico Nasty – American rapper
 Chuck Negrón American singer-songwriter; one of the three lead vocalists in the band Three Dog Night; Puerto Rican father, British mother
 Joe Negroni (1940–1978) American rock and roll pioneer; founding member of the rock group Frankie Lymon and the Teenagers; a Nuyorican
 Tito Nieves a leading salsa singer of the 1980s and early 1990s
 Asia Nitollano American singer member of The Pussycat Dolls; She is half Mexican and Puerto Rican ancestry
 N.O.R.E American hip hop recording artist; of Puerto Rican descent
 Colby O'Donis American singer of Puerto Rican parent
 Don Omar Puerto Rican reggaeton singer and rapper; resident of New Jersey
 Tony Orlando American show business professional; lead singer of the group Tony Orlando and Dawn in the early 1970s; Greek father, Puerto Rican mother
 Jeannie Ortega American singer of Puerto Rican descent
 Claudette Ortiz American singer and model, member of R&B group City High
 Joell Ortiz American rapper
 Pedro Ortiz Dávila better known as Davilita, Puerto Rican singer of boleros, danzas and patriotic songs
 Shalim Ortiz Puerto Rican singer; resident of Miami
 Charlie Palmieri (1927–1988) bandleader and musical director of salsa music
 Eddie Palmieri American pianist, bandleader and musician; born in New York

 Carlos Ponce Puerto Rican actor, singer, composer and television personality; lives in Miami
 Miguel Poventud, aka "El Niño Prodigio de Guayama" and "Miguelito" (1942–1983) Puerto Rican musician, singer, actor and composer of boleros; lived in New York
 Tito Puente (1923–2000) Puerto Rican singer and musician
 Ivy Queen Puerto Rican, reggaeton composer and singer
 Domingo Quiñones American singer of salsa music
 Ismael Quintana singer and American composer of salsa music
 Chamaco Ramírez (1941–1983) Puerto Rican salsa singer and composer; died in New York
 Val Ramos American; Puerto Rican parents
 Richie Ray virtuoso pianist, singer, music arranger, composer and religious minister
 Ray Reyes American born and Puerto Rican raised
 Ron Reyes American musician; second singer for the group Black Flag; of Puerto Rican descent
 Gabriel Ríos Puerto Rican pop singer
 Graciela Rivera (1921–2011) first Puerto Rican to sing a lead role at the Metropolitan Opera in New York
 Maso Rivera virtuoso cuatro player
 Mon Rivera – singer, composer and bandleader who specialized in plans; known as Mr. Trabalenguas
 Robb Rivera – drummer for heavy rock band Nonpoint; American born, father is Puerto Rican, lived on the island as a teenager. Father served in US Army in Korea and Vietnam
 Robbie Rivera DJ producer
 Chino Rodríguez (born 1954) music producer, band leader, musician, manager, booking agent, record company executive, business consultant, and American record label owner, specializing in Latin music, most notably salsa and Latin jazz; American-born, of Puerto Rican descent
 Daniel Rodríguez (tenor) American operatic tenor from New York City
 Tito Rodríguez (1923–1973) Puerto Rican singer and bandleader, known as "El inolvidable"
 Omar Rodríguez-López Puerto Rican singer and musician lead guitar for At the Drive-In and Mars Volta

 Draco Rosa American musician, dancer, singer-songwriter, multi-instrumentalist, record producer and actor
 Willie Rosario musician, composer and Puerto Rican bandleader of salsa music
 Felipe Rose (born 1954) American founding member of disco group the Village People; mother is Puerto Rican, father is Native American
 Frankie Ruiz (1958–1998) Puerto Rican salsa singer
 Hilton Ruiz (1952–2006) Puerto Rican American jazz pianist in the Afro-Cuban jazz mold; resident of Teaneck, New Jersey
 Sa-Fire American singer
 Jimmy Sabater, Sr. (1936–2012) American Latin musician; parents were Puerto Rican
 Bobby Sanabria American drummer, percussionist, composer, arranger, bandleader, educator, producer, and writer specializing in Latin jazz; of Puerto Rican descent
 Claudio Sánchez American writer and musician
 Gilberto Santa Rosa American salsa singer; of Puerto Rican descent
 Herman Santiago rock and roll pioneer and songwriter; claimed to have written the iconic hit "Why Do Fools Fall In Love"; Puerto Rican born and Nuyorucan raised
 Daniel Santos (1916–1992) Puerto Rican singer and composer of boleros and guarachas; died in Florida
 Ray Santos American Latin Grammy award-winning musician
 Romeo Santos American singer, featured composer and lead singer of the Bachata group Aventura; of Dominican and Puerto Rican descent
 Ray Sepúlveda Puerto Rican American salsa singer 
 Myrta Silva Puerto Rican singer and composer of guarachas as well as television hostess and producer
 Brenda K. Starr American singer-songwriter; Jewish American father, Puerto Rican mother
 Olga Tañon Puerto Rican singer; resident of Orlando, Florida
 Juan Tizol (1900–1984) Puerto Rican trombonist and composer
 Ray Toro guitarist of My Chemical Romance
 Manoella Torres "the woman who was born to sing"; American singer and actress; of Puerto Rican descent; resident of Mexico
 Tommy Torres Puerto Rican producer, singer, and songwriter
 Tony Touch American hip hop break dancer, rapper, DJ, producer and actor; of Puerto Rican descent
 Mario Vázquez pop and R&B American singer; Puerto Rican parents
 Alan Vega American vocalist
 Little Louie Vega American musician; half of the Masters At Work musical production team
 Jamila Velazquez, American singer and actress of Dominican and Puerto Rican descent
 Veronica American dance music singer and theatrical actress; parents were Puerto Rican
 Vico C Puerto Rican rapper and reggaeton artist; considered one of the founding fathers of reggaeton; influential in the development of Latin American hip hop; American of Puerto Rican descent and raised in Puerto Rico
 Y-Love American hip-hop artist; Ethiopian father, Puerto Rican mother
 Yomo Puerto Rican reggaeton recording artist

Groups
 Hoax alternative rock band, including Frantz N. Cesar of Haitian and Puerto Rican descent
 Kane & Abel rap duo of twin brothers Daniel and David Garcia; of African American and Puerto Rican descent
 Nina Sky twin sister singers; American of Puerto Rican parents
 Sweet Sensation Puerto Rican female freestyle-dance music trio of New York
 TKA Latin freestyle trio, prominent in the 1980s and early 1990s
 Wisin & Yandel Puerto Rican group

 Models and dancers 

 Arthur Aviles dancer and choreographer; of Puerto Rican descent
 Denise Bidot plus-size model who is of Puerto Rican and Kuwaiti descent
 Crazy Legs breakdancer, president of Rock Steady Crew
 Susie Castillo former beauty queen; held the Miss USA title; competed in the Miss Teen USA and Miss Universe pageants; Dominican father, Puerto Rican mother
 Carmella DeCesare American model; Playboy magazine's Miss April 2003 and Playmate of the Year 2004; of Italian and Puerto Rican descent
 Michelle Font beauty queen; Miss Washington USA; competed in the 2008 Miss USA pageant; of Cuban and Puerto Rican descent
 Jaslene Gonzalez Puerto Rican-American model, Puerto Rican born and American raised
 Melanie Iglesias American model and actress; of Puerto Rican, Italian, and Filipino heritage
 Danielle Polanco dancer and choreographer; Dominican-Puerto Rican American
 Pam Rodriguez American glamour model; of Guatemalan and Puerto Rican descent
 Jock Soto principal ballet dancer with the New York City Ballet
 Madison Anderson born in the United States to an Anglo-American father and Puerto Rican mother. Model and Pageant Queen who placed First runner up at Miss Florida USA 2019 and later on represented Puerto Rico at Miss Universe 2019 and placed First runner up again

 Sports 

 Benjamin Agosto American figure skater; Puerto Rican father, American mother of Romanian and Russian descent
 Eddie Alvarez American mixed martial artist; of Puerto Rican and Irish descent
 Carmelo Anthony NBA player of basketball; American of Puerto Rican and African American descent
 Carlos Arroyo professional basketball point guard, last played for the Boston Celtics
 Harry Arroyo American former boxer
 José Juan Barea NBA player; Puerto Rican resident of Miami
 Wilfred Benítez American boxer
 Héctor Camacho Puerto Rican professional boxer
 Héctor Camacho, Jr. Puerto Rican boxer and son of Héctor
 Eddie Casiano basketball player; American born and Puerto Rican raised; of Puerto Rican descent
 Orlando Cepeda Puerto Rican born, American raised
 Julie Chu American Olympic ice hockey player; plays forward on the US women's ice hockey team; Chinese and Puerto Rican 
 Roberto Clemente (1934–1972) Puerto Rican Major League Baseball right fielder; Hall of Fame
 Alex Cora former infielder in Major League Baseball, currently general manager of the Boston Red Sox
 Victor Cruz wide receiver in the NFL
 Guillermo Diaz Puerto Rican professional basketball player; NBA

 Nelson Erazo American professional wrestler, better known by his ring name "Homicide"; of Puerto Rican descent
 Justin Fargas American football running back; free agent in the NFL; son of Antonio Fargas
 Sunny Garcia American professional surfer
 Ernie Gonzalez  American professional golfer of Puerto Rican and Mexican descent.
 Herbert Lewis Hardwick, aka "Cocoa Kid" (1914–1966) boxer, inducted into the International Boxing Hall of Fame in 2012; born in Puerto Rico; Puerto Rican mother, African American father
 James "Chico" Hernandez American Sambo athlete; a seven-time member of the USA National Team
 Oscar Hernandez musician, musical arranger and American producer; of Puerto Rican descent
 Shawn Hernandez American professional wrestler, better known by his ring names "Hotstuff Hernandez" and "Hernandez"; of Mexican and Puerto Rican descent
 Reggie Jackson nicknamed "Mr. October" for his clutch hitting in the postseason with the New York Yankees; former American Major League Baseball right fielder; father was Martinez Jackson, half Puerto Rican
 Kevin Kesar American professional wrestler better known by his ring names "Killer Kross" and "Karrion Kross"; of Central American and Puerto Rican descent 
 Butch Lee NBA player; born in Puerto Rico, raised in New York
 Michael Lowell Puerto Rican Major League Baseball third baseman for the Boston Red Sox; Puerto Rican born, American raised
 Edgar Martínez nicknamed "Gar" and "Papi"; former Major League Baseball third baseman and designated hitter
 Luis Martínez American professional wrestler known by his ring names "Punishment Martinez", "Punisher Martinez", and "Damian Priest"; born in the Puerto Rican Diaspora of New York, raised in Dorado, Puerto Rico 
 Vanessa Martínez Puerto Rican swimmer, represented Puerto Rico at the 2003 Pan American Games
 Denise Masino American professional female bodybuilder from the U.S.

 Miguel Molina American professional wrestler known by his ring names "Angel Ortiz" and "Ortiz"; a Nuyorican; tag team partner of fellow Nuyorican professional wrestler Santana
 Carlos Ortiz Puerto Rican three-time world boxing champion, twice in the lightweight division and once in the junior welterweights
 Sam Parrilla (1943–1994) left fielder and pinch-hitter for the Philadelphia Phillies in 1970; played in the minor leagues 1963–1972; father of actress Lana Parrilla
 Travis Pastrana American motorsports competitor and stunt performer
 Orlando Perez American footballer of C.D. Chivas USA
 Rico Ramos American super bantamweight boxer and current WBA world super bantamweight champion
 Edwin Rios Puerto Rican baseball player for the Los Angeles Dodgers, World Series Champions of 2020.
 Ramón Rivas Puerto Rican professional basketball player; born in New York, of Puerto Rican descent
 Jorge Rivera American mixed martial artist; featured on The Ultimate Fighter 4; of Puerto Rican descent; born in Massachusetts; lived in Puerto Rico for a short time as a child
 Ron Rivera American football player and head coach
 Chi Chi Rodriguez Puerto Rican professional golfer
 John Ruiz former American professional boxer
 Mike Sanchez American professional wrestler known by his ringnames "Mike Draztik" and "Santana"; a Nuyorican; tag team partner of fellow Nuyorican professional wrestler Ortiz
 Daniel Santiago professional American basketball player; of Puerto Rican descent
 Shakur Stevenson American professional boxer of half-Puerto Rican descent
 Thea Trinidad American professional wrestler known by her ring names "Rosita" and "Zelina Vega"; of Puerto Rican descent; wife of Dutch professional wrestler Aleister Black
 Lisa Marie Varon American professional wrestler, bodybuilder and fitness competitor; of Puerto Rican and Turkish descent

 Criminals 
 Salvador Agrón, aka "The Capeman" (1943–1986) Puerto Rican gang member who murdered two teenagers in a Hell's Kitchen park in 1959
 Ariel Castro former school bus driver who kidnapped, raped, and tortured three women in Cleveland, Ohio and held them captive for a decade
 Raymond Márquez, aka "Spanish Raymond" reputed American gangster; parents are from Puerto Rico
 José Padilla, aka Abdullah al-Muhajir or Muhajir Abdullah American convicted of aiding terrorists

 Diplomats 

 Mari Carmen Aponte US Ambassador to El Salvador
 Adrian A. Basora American diplomat, and former US Ambassador to the Czech Republic
 César Benito Cabrera former US Ambassador to Mauritius and the Seychelles
 Gabriel Guerra-Mondragón US Ambassador to Chile 1994–1998
 Luis Guinot former US Ambassador to Costa Rica
 Hans Hertell former US Ambassador to the Dominican Republic
 Victor Marrero former US Ambassador to the OAS
 Carmen Maria Martinez former US Ambassador to Zambia
 Spencer Matthews King former US Ambassador to Guyana
 Edward G. Miller, Jr. (1911–1968) lawyer; Assistant Secretary of State for Inter-American Affairs 1949–1952
 Teodoro Moscoso former US Ambassador to Venezuela and head of Alliance for Progress
 Horacio Rivero Admiral (Ret.), former US Ambassador to Spain

 Educators 

 Joseph M. Acabá educator, hydrogeologist, and NASA astronaut; American of Puerto Rican parent
 Edwin David Aponte educator, author, religious leader, scholar of Latino religions and cultures; born in Connecticut to Puerto Rican parents
 Frank Bonilla (1925–2010) American academic of Puerto Rican descent who became a leading figure in Puerto Rican Studies.
 Ramón E. López American space physicist and author; played an instrumental role in the implementation of a hands-on science program in elementary and middle grades Montgomery County Public Schools in Maryland
 Andres Ramos Mattei (1940–1987) Puerto Rican sugar industry historian; died in New Brunswick, New Jersey
 Carlos Albizu Miranda (1920–1984) first Hispanic educator to have a North American University renamed in his honor; one of the first Hispanics to earn a Ph.D. in psychology in the US; Puerto Rican born and American raised
 Antonia Pantoja (1922–2002) educator, social worker, feminist, civil rights leader; founder of ASPIRA, the Puerto Rican Forum, Boricua College and Producir
 Ángel Ramos founder of the National Hispanic Council of the Deaf and Hard of Hearing; Superintendent of the Idaho School for the Deaf and the Blind; one of the few deaf people of Hispanic descent to earn a doctorate from Gallaudet University
 Carlos E. Santiago Puerto Rican American labor economist; 7th chancellor of University of Wisconsin–Milwaukee
 Ninfa Segarra last President of the New York City Board of Education

 Journalists 

 Veronica Cintron Award Winning primetime solo anchor
 María Celeste Arrarás journalist and TV news presenter
 Lynda Baquero American correspondent for WNBC news in New York City; of Puerto Rican ancestry
 Marysol Castro American television journalist and weather anchor for The Early Show on CBS
 Carmen Dominicci television journalist
 Jackie Guerrido Puerto Rican television weather forecaster and journalist
 Juan Gonzalez Puerto Rican born investigative journalist
 Kimberly Guilfoyle American cable news personality; one of the rotating co-hosts on The Five on Fox News Channel; host of an Internet-only crime-related program for Fox News; Puerto Rican mother, Irish father
 Alycia Lane American television journalist; of Puerto Rican and Welsh descent
 Lynda López Emmy Award-winning Puerto Rican American journalist; youngest sister of actress and singer Jennifer Lopez
 Natalie Morales television journalist
 Denisse Oller Puerto Rican broadcaster, journalist, newspaper columnist; former cooking show host and news anchor at WXTV in New York City
 Audrey Puente American meteorologist for WWOR-TV in New York City; daughter of Tito Puente
 Carlos D. Ramirez (1946–1999) American publisher; purchased El Diario La Prensa, the oldest Spanish-language newspaper in the US

 Jorge L. Ramos Puerto Rican announcer of Telemundo's New York City affiliate; moved to New York City in 1976
 Craig Rivera American television journalist, producer, and correspondent for Fox News Channel; father was a Puerto Rican of Sephardic Jew descent
 Geraldo Rivera American talk-show host, journalist; brother of Craig Rivera
 Darlene Rodriguez American co-anchor of Today in New York; of Puerto Rican ancestry
 Edna Schmidt American journalist; former news anchor for Noticiero Univision Edicion Nocturna Ray Suarez television and radio journalist
 Elizabeth Vargas television journalist; American of Puerto Rican descent
 Jane Velez-Mitchell American award-winning television journalist and bestselling author; mother is Puerto Rican, father is Irish American

 Judges and law enforcement 
 Jose Báez criminal defense attorney; notable for his defense of accused child murderer Casey Anthony
 José A. Cabranes judge on the U.S. Court of Appeals for the Second Circuit; formerly a practicing lawyer, government official, and law teacher; first Puerto Rican appointed to a federal judgeship in the continental US
 Albert Díaz American judge on the U.S. Court of Appeals for the Fourth Circuit; parents are Puerto Rican

 Nicholas Estavillo first Puerto Rican and first Hispanic in the history of the NYPD to reach the three-star rank of Chief of Patrol
 Faith Evans Hawaiian-Puerto Rican; first woman to be named U.S. Marshal
 Julio M. Fuentes Circuit Judge on the U.S. Court of Appeals for the Third Circuit; first Hispanic judge to serve the Third Circuit; Puerto Rican born, American raised
 Juan Manuel García Passalacqua (1937–2010) political commentator, lawyer; Puerto Rican, died in Ohio

 Dora Irizarry Puerto Rican federal judge in New York
 Irma Lozada first female police officer to die in action in New York
 José Meléndez-Pérez Puerto Rican-born U.S. Customs and Border Protection Inspector at Orlando International Airport who became a key figure for the 9/11 Commission when he refused entry to an alleged terrorist prior to the September 11, 2001 attacks
 Carmen Ortiz prosecutor attorney, Boston, Massachusetts; American born
 Juan Pérez-Giménez Puerto Rican born, U.S. federal judge in senior status
 Jaime Rios (judge) judge on the New York Supreme Court.
 Roberto A. Rivera-Soto Associate Justice of the New Jersey Supreme Court; American born, Puerto Rican raised
 Vanessa Ruiz Puerto Rican associate Judge of the District of Columbia Court of Appeals, the highest court for the District of Columbia
 Benito Romano first American of Puerto Rican heritage to hold the US Attorney's post in New York on an interim basis
 Joe Sánchez American highly decorated former New York City police officer; author whose books give an insight as to the corruption within the department; parents are Puerto Rican
 Sonia Maria Sotomayor Associate Justice of the Supreme Court of the U.S. since August 2009; the Court's 111th justice, its first Hispanic justice, and its third female justice
 Edgardo Ramos United States District Judge of the United States District Court for the Southern District of New York since 2011.
 Edwin Torres New York state supreme court judge and author; parents are Puerto Rican
 Juan R. Torruella Puerto Rican jurist; currently a judge on the U.S. Court of Appeals for the First Circuit; first and to date only Hispanic to serve in that court

 Military 

 Joseph B. Avilés (1897–1990) served in the U.S. Navy and later in the Coast Guard; in 1925, became the first Hispanic Chief Petty Officer in the U.S. Coast Guard; Puerto Rican, lived in Maryland
 Rafael Celestino Benítez (1917–1999) highly decorated submarine commander who led the rescue effort of the crew members of the USS Cochino during the Cold War
 José M. Cabanillas (1901–1979) Puerto Rican executive Officer of the USS Texas, which participated in the invasions of North Africa and the Battle of Normandy (D-Day) during World War II; died in Virginia
 Iván Castro U.S. Army officer who has continued serving on active duty in the Special Forces despite losing his eyesight; parents are Puerto Rican
 Richard Carmona American physician and public health administrator
 Carmen Contreras-Bozak (born 1919) first Hispanic to serve in the U.S. Women's Army Corps, where she served as an interpreter and in numerous administrative positions; Puerto Rican; lives in Tampa, Florida
 Linda García Cubero former U.S. Air Force officer; of Mexican-American-Puerto Rican descent
 Rubén A. Cubero highly decorated member of the U.S. Air Force; first Hispanic graduate of the US Air Force Academy to be named Dean of the Faculty of the academy; parents were Puerto Rican
 Alberto Díaz, Jr. first Hispanic Director of the San Diego Naval District and Balboa Naval Hospital; Puerto Rican born and raised
 Rafael O'Ferrall United States Army officer; first Hispanic of Puerto Rican descent to become the Deputy Commanding General for the Joint Task Force at Guantanamo Bay, Cuba
 Salvador E. Felices (1923–1987) first Puerto Rican to reach the rank of major general (two-star) in the U.S. Air Force; died in Florida
 Diego E. Hernández retired U.S. Navy officer; first Hispanic to be named Vice Commander, North American Aerospace Defense Command; Puerto Rican resident of  Miami
 Lester Martínez López, MD, MPH (born 1955) first Hispanic to head the Army Medical and Research Command at Fort Detrick, Maryland
 Carlos Lozada (1946–1967) member of the U.S. Army; one of five Puerto Ricans who posthumously received the Medal of Honor for their actions in combat; Puerto Rican born, raised in New York City
 Ángel Méndez (1946–1967) U.S. Marine, posthumously awarded the Navy Cross
 Virgil Rasmuss Miller (1900–1968) U.S. Army officer who served as Regimental Commander of the 442d Regimental Combat Team, a unit composed of "Nisei" (second generation Americans of Japanese descent), during World War II
 Héctor Andrés Negroni Puerto Rican historian, senior aerospace defense executive, author; first Puerto Rican graduate of the U.S. Air Force Academy; lives in Vienna, Virginia
 Antonia Novello Puerto Rican physician and public health administrator; US Surgeon General
 María Inés Ortiz (1967–2007) first American nurse to die in combat during Operation Iraqi Freedom; first Army nurse to die in combat since the Vietnam War; parents were Puerto Rican

 Héctor E. Pagán U.S. Army officer; first Hispanic of Puerto Rican descent to become Deputy Commanding General of the US Army John F. Kennedy Special Warfare Center and School at Fort Bragg, North Carolina
 José M. Portela retired officer of the U.S. Air Force; served in the position of Assistant Adjutant General for Air while also serving as commander of the Puerto Rico Air National Guard
 Marion Frederic Ramírez de Arellano (1913–1980) submarine commander in the US Navy; first Hispanic submarine commanding officer
 Frederick Lois Riefkohl (1889–1969) Puerto Rican officer in the U.S. Navy; first Puerto Rican to graduate from the U.S. Naval Academy and to be awarded the Navy Cross; lived and died in Florida
 Rudolph W. Riefkohl (1885–1950) U.S. Army officer; instrumental in helping the people of Poland overcome the 1919 typhus epidemic
 Pedro N. Rivera retired Puerto Rican US Air Force officer; in 1994 became the first Hispanic medical commander in the Air Force; lives in Alexandria, Virginia
 Elmelindo Rodrigues Smith (1935–1967) – U.S. Army soldier posthumously awarded the Medal of Honor for his actions in the Vietnam War; of Puerto Rican descent
 Augusto Rodríguez Puerto Rican officer in the Union Army during the American Civil War; immigrated to the US in the 1850s
 Pedro Rodríguez (1912–1999) earned two Silver Stars within a seven-day period during the Korean War; Puerto Rican; died in Washington, D.C.
 Fernando E. Rodríguez Vargas (1888–1932) Puerto Rican odontologist (dentist), scientist and a major in the US Army; discovered the bacteria which causes cavities; died in Washington, D.C.
 Maritza Sáenz Ryan U.S. Army officer; head of the Department of Law at the US Military Academy; first woman and first Hispanic West Point graduate to serve as an academic department head; Puerto Rican father, Spanish mother
 Héctor Santiago-Colón (1942–1968) one of five Puerto Ricans posthumously presented with the Medal of Honor, the highest military decoration awarded by the U.S.; Puerto Rican from New York
 Frances M. Vega (1983–2003) first female soldier of Puerto Rican descent to die in a combat zone, in Operation Iraqi Freedom
 Pedro del Valle (1893–1978) U.S. Marine Corps officer; first Hispanic to reach the rank of lieutenant general; in 1900 his family emigrated to the US and became US citizens
 Humbert Roque Versace (1937–1965) – American U.S. Army officer of Puerto Rican-Italian descent; awarded the US' highest military decoration, the Medal of Honor, for his heroic actions while a prisoner of war during the Vietnam War
 Ramón Colón-López (1971-     ) - Fourth Senior Enlisted Advisor to the Chairman, the most senior enlisted airman in the United States Military, from Ponce, Puerto Rico. On June 13, 2007, Colón-López became the first Hispanic, and one of the first six airmen, to be awarded the newly created Air Force Combat Action Medal.

 Political 
 Herman Badillo Puerto Rican-born US Representative; first Puerto Rican elected to the US Congress
 Roberto Rexach Benítez Puerto Rican politician; former Senator and Representative
 Adolfo Carrión, Jr. Democratic politician; of Puerto Rican descent, from City Island, New York
 Ruth Noemí Colón Puerto Rican; 66th Secretary of State of New York
 Pedro Cortés Puerto Rican former Secretary of the Commonwealth of Pennsylvania

 Lorraine Cortés-Vázquez 65th Secretary of State of New York, serving in the Cabinet of Governor David Paterson; of Puerto Rican and Dominican descent
 Nelson Antonio Denis American former New York politician who represented East Harlem in the New York State Assembly; of Puerto Rican descent
 Rubén Díaz, Sr. Puerto Rican born US politician; Democrat; represents the 32nd District in the New York State Senate
 Rubén Díaz, Jr. Democratic Party politician from the Bronx in New York City; son of New York State Senator Rubén Díaz, Sr.
 Wilda Díaz Mayor of Perth Amboy, New Jersey from 2008 to 2020
 Martín Malavé Dilán member of the New York State Senate representing the 17th Senatorial District
 Pedro Espada, Jr. Democratic member of the New York Senate for the 33rd Senate District; Puerto Rican born, American raised

 Maurice Ferré Puerto Rican former six-term Mayor of Miami
 Bonnie García former representative of California's 80th Assembly District, serving eastern Riverside County and all of Imperial County
 Robert García former Democratic US Representative who represented New York's 21st district, 1978–1990
 Luis Gutiérrez US Representative; American of Puerto Rican descent
 Raúl Labrador Puerto Rican born US Representative for Idaho's 1st congressional district
 Margarita López openly lesbian former New York City Council Member who represented New York City Council's 2nd district from 1998 to 2005
 Evelyn Mantilla American politician from Connecticut who served from 1997 to 2007 as a member of the Connecticut House of Representatives
 Melissa Mark-Viverito elected Speaker of the New York City Council in January 2014
 Olga A. Méndez (1925–2009) first Puerto Rican woman elected to a state legislature in the US mainland
 Rosie Méndez American Democratic Party politician in New York
 Tony Méndez first native-born Puerto Rican to become a district leader of a major political party in New York City
 Hiram Monserrate former member of the New York State Senate
 Alexandria Ocasio-Cortez American politician, currently (2019) representing New York's 14th congressional district
 Félix Ortiz American politician, currently representing New York's 51st Assembly District
 George Pabey former mayor of East Chicago, Indiana
 César A. Perales American Secretary of State of New York; of Puerto Rican and Dominican descent
 Eddie Pérez politician; born in Puerto Rico and raised in the US
 Adam Clayton Powell IV member of the New York State Assembly
 Luis A. Quintana Puerto Rican-born who served as Mayor of Newark, New Jersey, from 2013 to 2014
 John Quiñones first Republican of Puerto Rican ancestry elected to the Florida House of Representatives
 Charles B. Rangel US Representative for New York's 15th congressional district, since 1971; son of Puerto Rican father and African American mother  
 Samuel Rivera Democratic mayor of the U.S. city of Passaic, New Jersey (2001–2008)
 Pedro Segarra politician and Mayor of Hartford, Connecticut; Puerto Rican born and American raised
 José Enrique Serrano US Representative; Puerto Rican born, American raised
 José M. Serrano American New York State Senator; son of José Enrique Serrano
 Darren Soto Orlando-based attorney and Democratic politician who serves the member of the Florida House of Representatives for District 49
  Joey Torres elected mayor of Paterson, New Jersey in 2014, where he had served two prior terms as mayor
 Gloria Tristani served from 1997 to 2001 as the first Hispanic woman member of the Federal Communications Commission
 Miguel del Valle American politician; former City Clerk of Chicago; Puerto Rican born, American raised
 Nydia Velázquez Puerto Rican and US Representative
 Raúl G. Villaronga retired Puerto Rican US Army officer; first Puerto Rican mayor of a Texas city; elected Mayor of Killeen, Texas in 1992

Visual arts
 Olga Albizu (1924–2005) Puerto Rican abstract expressionist painter; emigrated to New York in 1948
 Fernando Allende (Mexican/Puerto Rican)  With major and successful art exhibits and the inclusion of his art in museums and private collections, Fernando Allende is considered a pioneer on dynamic art represented with the line in motion and connecting in harmony. Participating in the Florence biennial and summer at La Academia, confirms Allende's influence in contemporary abstract art.
 Jean-Michel Basquiat (1960–1988) visual artist; African-American of Haitian and Puerto Rican descent
 David Blaine American illusionist, magician, and endurance artist; of Puerto Rican-Russian Jewish descent
 Rafael Ferrer Puerto Rican artist; 1993 recipient of a Pew Fellowship in the Arts; 2011 recipient of an Annalee and Barnett Newman Foundation Grant
 Elizabeth Marrero Puerto Rican performance artist, comedian, known as Macha, the "papi chulo drag king", a character she created in 1999; lives in the US
 Soraida Martínez contemporary abstract expressionist artist who creates hard-edge paintings; American of Puerto Rican descent
 Ralph Ortiz American artist, educator, and founder of El Museo del Barrio
 Manuel Rivera-Ortiz Puerto Rican documentary photographer; lives in the US
 Joe Shannon – prolific artist with permanent exhibits in multiple museums in the United States
 Filipo Tirado, aka "Pepe Locuaz" Puerto Rican puppeteer

 Civil rights and activists 

 Mathias Brugman (1811–1868) leader in Puerto Rico's independence revolution against Spain known as El Grito de Lares (The Cry of Lares); father was Pierre Brugman from Curaçao of Dutch-Jewish ancestry, mother was from Puerto Rico
 Oscar Collazo (1914–1994) one of two Puerto Ricans who attempted to assassinate US President Harry S. Truman
 Angelo Falcón political scientist; President and founder of National Institute for Latino Policy; Puerto Rican born and American raised
 Inéz García cause celebre of the feminist movement; of Puerto Rican and Cuban descent
 Olga Viscal Garriga (1929–1995) public orator, political activist; descendant of a former governor of Puerto Rico; advocate for Puerto Rican independence
 Isabel González (1882–1971) Puerto Rican activist who helped pave the way for Puerto Ricans to be given US citizenship; lived in New York and New Jersey
 Sonia Gutierrez Puerto Rican-born American educator and Hispanic rights activist.
 Marie Haydée Beltrán Torres nationalist
 Óscar López Rivera nationalist pardoned by President Barack Obama
 Eliana Martínez young AIDS activist in notable Florida court case regarding the rights of HIV+ children in public schools* Sylvia Méndez American civil rights activist; of Mexican-Puerto Rican heritage
 Eugene Nelson American labor leader

 Manuel Olivieri Sánchez (born 1888) Puerto Rican court interpreter and civil rights activist; led the legal battle which recognized US citizenship for Puerto Ricans living in Hawaii
 Carmen Pola Puerto Rican long-time politician and community activist in Boston, Massachusetts; first Latina to run for statewide office; first Director of the Office of Constituent Services
 Ronald Rivera (1948–2008) American activist best known for developing an inexpensive ceramic water filter used to treat gray water in impoverished communities, and for establishing community-based factories to produce the filters around the world
 Sylvia Rae Rivera (1951–2002) American transgender activist; founding member of the Gay Liberation Front and the Gay Activists Alliance; helped found STAR (Street Transvestite Action Revolutionaries); of Puerto Rican and Venezuelan descent
 Helen Rodríguez-Trías (1929–2001) American pediatrician, educator and women's rights activist
 Anthony Romero American executive director of the American Civil Liberties Union
 Arturo Alfonso Schomburg (1874–1938) Puerto Rican historian, writer, and activist in the US who raised awareness of the social contributions made by Afro-Latin Americans and Afro-Americans; died in New York
 Yolanda Serrano (-1993) Puerto Rican-born New Yorker HIV/AIDS activist and a Ms. magazine woman of the year
 Alejandrina Torres nationalist
 Griselio Torresola (1925–1950) one of two Puerto Rican Nationalists who attempted to assassinate US President Harry Truman; Puerto Rico born

 Physicians and scientists 

 Joseph M. Acabá American educator, hydrogeologist, and NASA astronaut; parents are Puerto Rican
 Oxiris Barbot, Commissioner of Health of the City of New York
 Víctor Manuel Blanco, PhD (1918–2011) Puerto Rican astronomer; in 1959 discovered "Blanco 1," a galactic cluster; died in Florida
 Rafael L. Brás American civil engineer; Provost to the Georgia Institute of Technology; Puerto Rican-born
 Neil deGrasse Tyson American astrophysicist, author, and science communicator. His mother is of Puerto Rican ancestry.
 Enectalí Figueroa-Feliciano, PhD, aka "Tali" astrophysicist and researcher with NASA Goddard Space Flight Center; pioneered the development of position-sensitive detectors
 Gerónimo Lluberas (1956–2003) Puerto Rican physician, humanitarian, writer and composer
 Ramón E. López space physicist and author
 Lissette Martínez lead electrical engineer for the Space Experiment Module program at the Wallops Flight Facility
 Joseph O. Prewitt Díaz, PhD retired psychologist; specialized in psychosocial theory; first Puerto Rican recipient of the American Psychological Association; 2008 International Humanitarian Award
 Pedro Rodríguez, PhD Director of a test laboratory at NASA; inventor of a portable, battery-operated lift seat for people suffering from knee arthritis
 Fernando E. Rodríguez Vargas, DDS (1888–1932) odontologist (dentist), scientist and a major in the US Army who discovered the bacteria which causes cavities
 Gualberto Ruaño, MD, PhD pioneer in the field of personalized medicine; inventor of molecular diagnostic systems used worldwide for the management of viral diseases

 Religious 
 Nicky Cruz (born 1938) Christian evangelist; founder of Nicky Cruz Outreach, an evangelistic Christian ministry
 Alberto Cutié Puerto Rican Episcopal cleric better known as Padre Alberto; ordained a Roman Catholic priest in 1995; became an internationally recognizable name by hosting television and radio programs
 José Luis de Jesús founder and leader of Creciendo en Gracia's Christian ministry (Growing In Grace International Ministry, Inc.), based in Miami, Florida
 Bavi Edna Rivera, aka "Nedi" American suffragan bishop and Episcopal priest; daughter of the late bishop Victor Manuel Rivera and an Anglo mother
 Víctor Manuel Rivera (1916–2005) Puerto Rican born American Episcopalian priest and bishop

Writers
 Jack Agüeros community activist, poet, writer, and translator
 Quiara Alegría Hudes American playwright and author, known for writing the book for the Tony Award-winning musical In the Heights; of Jewish and Puerto Rican descent
 Miguel Algarín Puerto Rican poet, writer, co-founder of the Nuyorican Poets Café
 Rane Arroyo (1954–2010) American poet, playwright, and scholar; of Puerto Rican descent
 Pura Belpré (1899 or 1903–1982) author; first Puerto Rican librarian in New York City
 Giannina Braschi Puerto Rican poet and novelist; lives in New York
 Julia de Burgos (1914–1953) considered by many as the greatest Puerto Rican poet and one of the greatest female poets of Latin America; died in New York
 Judith Ortiz Cofer (born 1952) author; Puerto Rican-born and American raised
 Jesús Colón (1901–1974) Puerto Rican writer, known as the "father of the Nuyorican movement"
 Víctor Hernández Cruz Puerto Rican poet; New York resident
 Nicholas Dante (1941–1991) American dancer and writer; Puerto Rican parents
 Nelson Denis (born 1954) Author of War Against All Puerto Ricans, film director, and former New York State Assemblyman
 Sandra María Esteves American poet, playwright, and graphic artist; of Puerto Rican, Dominican and African American descent
 Lawrence La Fountain-Stokes Puerto Rican author, scholar, and performer; lives in Michigan
 Pedro J. Labarthe (1905–1966) Puerto Rican poet, journalist, essayist, and novelist
 Tato Laviera Nuyorican poet; born in Puerto Rico; moved to New York City with his family in 1960
 Muna Lee (1895–1965) American author and poet; known for her writings that promoted Pan-Americanism and feminism
 Érika López American cartoonist, novelist, and performance artist; of Puerto Rican and German American descent
 Caridad de la Luz, aka "La Bruja" (The "Good" Witch) poet, actress and activist; parents are Puerto Rican
 Nemir Matos-Cintrón Puerto Rican author; lives in Florida

 John Meléndez, aka "Stuttering John" American television writer and former radio personality
 Nicholasa Mohr one of the best known Nuyorican writers
 Micol Ostow American author, editor and educator; Jewish-American father, Puerto Rican mother
 George Pérez Puerto Rican-American writer and illustrator of comic books; his family moved from Caguas to the New York area in the 1940s
 Pedro Pietri (1944–2004) Nuyorican poet and playwright; co-founded the Nuyorican Poets Cafe; Puerto Rican born and American raised
 Carmen M. Pursifull former New York City Latin dance and Latin American music figure of the 1950s, and since 1970 in Illinois; English-language free verse poet; of Puerto Rican and Spanish descent
 Marie Teresa Ríos (1917–1999) American author of a book which was the basis for the 1960s television sitcom The Flying Nun; of Puerto Rican and Irish descent
 Ángel Rivero Méndez wrote , which is considered one of the most complete works written in regard to that military action
 Esmeralda Santiago Puerto Rican author and former actress known for her novels and memoirs
 Tony Santiago Puerto Rican military historian
 Arturo Alfonso Schomburg, aka Arthur Schomburg (1874–1938) Puerto Rican historian, writer, and activist in the US who raised awareness of the social contributions made by Afro-Latin Americans and Afro-Americans; died in New York; immigrated to New York in 1891
 Piri Thomas (1928–2011) writer and American poet; memoir Down These Mean Streets'' became a best-seller; Puerto Rican mother, Cuban father
 Edwin Torres Nuyorican poet
 Ed Vega (1936–2008) Puerto Rican novelist and short story writer
 Irene Vilar editor, literary agent, author of books dealing with national and generational trauma and women's reproductive rights
 William Carlos Williams (1883–1963) American poet, closely associated with modernism and Imagism; of English and Puerto Rican descent

Others 
 Aída Álvarez first Hispanic woman and Puerto Rican to hold a US Cabinet-level position; grew up in New York
 Nixzmary Brown (1998–2006) seven-year-old abused child and murder victim from the Bedford-Stuyvesant, Brooklyn section of New York City; of Puerto Rican and Pakistanian descent
 Marta Casals Istomin former president of the Manhattan School of Music; Puerto Rican born
 Carmen Carrera  American reality television personality
 Chris Kubecka  (full name Christina Kubecka de Medina, Computer Science, Cyberwar) established international business operations for Saudi Aramco after the world's most devastating Shamoon cyberwarfare attacks. Kubecka helped halt the second wave of July 2009 cyberattacks cyberwar attacks against South Korea.
 Angie Martínez American radio personality
 Samuel A. Ramírez, Sr. first Hispanic to launch a successful investment banking firm; parents are Puerto Ricans
 Félix Rigau Carrera (1894–1954) first Puerto Rican pilot
 José Rodríguez (intelligence) head of CIA division (2004–2008)

See also

 List of Hispanic and Latino Americans
 List of Puerto Ricans
 List of Spanish Americans
 Puerto Rican migration to New York
 Puerto Rican citizenship
 Outline of Puerto Rico
 Cultural diversity in Puerto Rico
 Corsican immigration to Puerto Rico
 Chinese immigration to Puerto Rico
 French immigration to Puerto Rico
 Crypto-Judaism
 German immigration to Puerto Rico
 Irish immigration to Puerto Rico
 Royal Decree of Graces of 1815
 Index of Puerto Rico-related articles
 History of women in Puerto Rico
 Military history of Puerto Rico
 National Register of Historic Places listings in Puerto Rico
 Piragua (food)
 51-star flag

References

External links 
 US Puerto Ricans.org Re/envisioning the Diaspora

Puerto Ricans, List Of Stateside
Puerto Rican